Eupterote epicharis is a moth in the family Eupterotidae. It was described by West in 1932. It is found in the Philippines.

The wingspan is about 64 mm. The forewings are chamois, lightly suffused with brown for two-thirds and with the antemedial fascia consisting of a broad, excurved, warm sepia line from the costa subbasally to the inner margin antemedially. The medial fascia consists of two warm sepia lines and the postmedial fascia consists of two warm sepia lines. The subterminal area is suffused with brown in which is a fascia of seven broad, light buff lunules. The basal two-thirds of the hindwings is chamois and the distal third is suffused with brown. The medial fascia consists of two faintly marked, excurved, warm sepia lines and the postmedial fascia consists of two warm sepia, excurved lines. There is also a fascia of seven broad, light buff lunules in the subterminal area.

References

Moths described in 1932
Eupterotinae
Insects of the Philippines